Lippe-Brake was a county during the 17th century, located in Lippe, Germany, and ruled by a branch of the House of Lippe.

History 

The county was created in 1621 for Otto, Count of Lippe-Brake, second son of Count Simon VI of Lippe who had passed away in 1613. Otto's elder brother Simon VII ruled Lippe-Detmold, while his younger brother Philip I, Count of Schaumburg-Lippe inherited Lippe-Alverdissen and founded the Schaumburg-Lippe branch following an inheritance in 1640.

On the death of Count Louis Ferdinand in 1709 Lippe-Brake was inherited by the senior Lippe-Detmold line.

Counts of Lippe-Brake (1613–1709)

See also
List of consorts of Lippe

Notes

References
Regnal chronology
Chronology of Lippe

Former countries in Europe
Counties of the Holy Roman Empire